Jens Martin Arctander Jenssen (28 July 1885 – 3 October 1968) was a Norwegian politician for the Communist Party.

Jenssen was born in Evenes. He was elected to the Norwegian Parliament from the Market towns of Østfold and Akershus counties in 1945, but was not re-elected in 1949 as the Communist Party dropped from 11 to 0 seats in Parliament.

Markussen was a member of the executive committee of Fredrikstad city council during the terms 1919–1922 and 1922–1925.

Contrary to most Communist Party representatives in the Parliament, Jenssen had higher education. He worked with libraries and as a teacher.

References

1885 births
1968 deaths
Communist Party of Norway politicians
Members of the Storting
Norwegian communists
20th-century Norwegian politicians
People from Evenes